La Puerta de Segura is a city and municipality located in the province of Jaén, part of the autonomous community of Andalusia in southern Spain. According to the 2005 census (INE), the city has a population of 2,646 inhabitants.

References 

Municipalities in the Province of Jaén (Spain)